Kenneth Edward "Pete" Shaw (born August 25, 1954 in Newark, New Jersey) is a former American football safety who played eight seasons in the National Football League for the San Diego Chargers and the New York Giants.  He played college football at Northwestern University and was drafted in the sixth round of the 1977 NFL Draft.  

Shaw attended Barringer High School. He is the younger brother of legendary jazz trumpeter Woody Shaw.

References

External links
NFL.com player page

1954 births
Living people
Barringer High School alumni
Players of American football from Newark, New Jersey
American football safeties
Northwestern Wildcats football players
San Diego Chargers players
New York Giants players